Nagyszékely is a village in Tolna county, Hungary. Until the end of World War II, the majority Inhabitants was Protestant Danube Swabians (Schwowe) whose Ancestors once came at 1720 - 1722 from Hanau. Mostly of the former German Settlers was expelled to Allied-occupied Germany and Allied-occupied Austria in 1945–1948, about the Potsdam Agreement.

Around 1790, Catholic German families from Nagyszékely settled in Illocska.

References

Populated places in Tolna County